The Jordan Museum is located in Ras Al-Ein district of Amman, Jordan. Built in 2014, the museum is the largest museum in Jordan and hosts the country's most important archaeological findings. Its two main permanent exhibitions are the Dead Sea Scrolls, including the Copper Scroll, and the 9000-year-old ʿAin Ghazal statues, which are among the oldest human statues ever made.

The museum presents artifacts from various prehistoric archaeological sites in Jordan.

The collections in the museum are arranged in chronological order and also features lecture halls, outdoor exhibitions, a library, a conservation centre and an area for children's activities. The museum was established by a committee headed by Queen Rania, which became the only museum in Jordan to implement modern artifact-preserving technologies.

Background
The Jordan Archaeological Museum was established in 1951, atop Amman's Citadel, to host Jordan's most important archaeological findings. However, the old site became too small and the idea of developing a new modern museum emerged in 2005. A joint committee headed by Queen Rania became responsible for developing the idea of a new modern museum by international standards. Construction started in 2009 and the museum was officially opened in 2014, spanning over 10,000 square meters.

Location
The museum is located in the Ras Al-Ein area near downtown Amman, adjacent to the Greater Amman Municipality headquarters. The Museum is only a street away (20-minute's walk) from major archaeological sites in Amman such as the Roman theater, Nymphaeum, Amman Citadel and The Hashemite Plaza.

Major artifacts
The museum collection includes animal bones dating back to 1.5 million years, 9000-year-old ʿAin Ghazal lime plaster statues, part of the Dead Sea Scrolls, including the Copper Scroll, and a reproduction of the Mesha Stele. 

The human statues found at 'Ain Ghazal constitute one of the world's oldest human statues ever made by human civilization dating back to 7000 BC. 'Ain Ghazal is a major Neolithic village in Amman that was discovered in 1981.

The Dead Sea Copper Scroll was found near Khirbet Qumran, which is an inventory of hidden gold and silver in specie, but also some vessels, presumably taken from the Temple in Jerusalem in circa 68 CE. It is written in a Mishnaic-style of Hebrew.

The Mesha Stele is a large black basalt stone that was erected in Moab and was inscribed by Moabite king Mesha, in which he lauds himself for the building projects that he initiated in Moab (modern day Al-Karak) and commemorates his glory and victory against the Israelites. The stele constitutes one of the most important direct accounts of biblical history.

Other major artifacts are the Balu'a Stele, with an Egyptian hieroglyphic inscription, and the marble head of the Greek goddess Tyche.

See also
List of museums in Jordan

References

External links

 
Facebook page

Museums established in 2014
Archaeological museums in Jordan
2014 establishments in Jordan
Museums of Ancient Near East in Jordan
Museums in Amman